Wassenberg is a town in the district Heinsberg, in North Rhine-Westphalia, Germany. It is situated near the border with the Netherlands, on the river Rur, approx. 6 km north-east of Heinsberg and 15 km south-east of Roermond.

References

External links

Heinsberg (district)